Selero is a village and a former community in the Xanthi regional unit, East Macedonia and Thrace, Greece. Since the 2011 local government reform it is part of the municipality Abdera, of which it is a municipal unit. The municipal unit has an area of 30.565 km2. Population 5,229 (2011).

References

Populated places in Xanthi (regional unit)